Canada men's national goalball team is the men's national team of Canada.  Goalball is a team sport designed specifically for athletes with a vision impairment.  The team takes part in international goalball competitions.

Paralympic Games

1976 Toronto 

The 1976 Summer Paralympics were held in Toronto, Canada.  The team was one of seven teams participating, and they finished sixth overall.  At the 1980 Summer Paralympics in Arnhem, Netherlands, twelve teams took part.  The team finished ninth. New York hosted the 1984 Summer Paralympics where thirteen teams participated and the team finished eleventh.

1984 New York 

The team competed in the 1984 Summer Paralympics at Long Island, New York City, United States of America, where thirteen men's and five women's teams participated.

Canada finished eleventh, ahead of Denmark and Australia.

1988 Seoul 

The team competed in the 1988 Summer Paralympics, from 15 to 24 October 1988, in Seoul, South Korea.  There were fourteen men's and eight women's teams.  This was the first time the term "Paralympic" came into official use.

Canada placed sixth in the final rankings.

1992 Barcelona 

The team competed in the 1992 Summer Paralympics, from 3 to 14 September 1992, in the Pavelló de la Vall d'Hebron indoor stadium, Barcelona, Spain.  There were twelve men's and eight women's teams.

Canada placed fifth in the final rankings.

1996 Atlanta 

The team competed in the 1996 Summer Paralympics, from 16 to 25 August 1996, in the GSU Sports Arena building, Atlanta, Georgia, United States of America.  There were twelve men's and eight women's teams.  Athletes were: Mario Caron, Jeff Christy, J. Crepault, Roberto Gaunt, Eric Houle, and Dean Kozak.

The team made the silver medal finals but lost to Finland.

2004 Athens 

The team competed in 2004 Summer Paralympics, from 17 and 28 September 2004, in the Faliro Sports Pavilion Arena, Athens, Greece.  There were twelve men's and eight women's teams.  Athletes were: Mario Caron, Jeff Christy, Rob Christy, Bruno Hache, Kevin Kaminski, and Dean Kozak.

The team made the bronze medal finals but lost to the USA.

2008 Beijing 

The team did not compete in 2008 Summer Paralympics, from 6 to 17 September 2008, in the Beijing Institute of Technology Gymnasium 'bat wing' arena, Beijing, China.  There were twelve men's and eight women's teams.  Athletes were: Mario Caron, Jeff Christy, Rob Christy, Bruno Hache, and Dean Kozak.

The team lost to Lithuania in the quarter-finals.

2012 London 

The team competed in the 2012 Summer Paralympics from 30 August to 7 September 2012, in the Copper Box Arena, London, England.

2016 Rio 

The team competed in the 2016 Summer Paralympics, with competition from Thursday 8 September to finals on Friday 16 September 2016, in the temporary Future Arena, Rio de Janeiro, Brazil.  There were ten men's and ten women's teams (a decrease of two men's teams from past years).

 Quarter-finals

World Championships 

IBSA World Goalball Championships have been held every four years from 1978.  The men's team regularly represents Canada in these championships.  Placing first or second in the tournament may earn a berth in the Paralympic Games goalball tournaments.

1978 Voecklamarkt

The team competed in the inaugural goalball world championships, in Vöcklamarkt, Austria.  There were ten men's teams.  Canada ranked seventh.

1982 Indianapolis 

The team competed in the 1982 World Championships, from Monday 28 June to 01 July 1982, at the Hinkle Fieldhouse, Butler University in Indianapolis, Indiana, United States of America.  Organised by United States Association of Blind Athletes, there were twelve men's and six women's teams.  Coach was Michaud Luis, with athletes Bourdeau, Caron, Lambert, Leduc, and Rodrigue.

Canada came fourth in the final rankings, behind Egypt, Nederlands, and USA.

1986 Roermond 

The 1986 IBSA World Goalball Championships were held in Roermond, the Netherlands.  There were eighteen men's and ten women's teams.

Canada came eleventh in the final rankings.

1990 Calgary  

The team competed in the 1990 World Championships, in Calgary, Alberta, Canada.  There were twelve men's and seven women's teams.

Canada came sixth in the final rankings.

1994 Colorado Springs  

The team competed in the 1994 World Championships, in Colorado Springs, Colorado, United States of America.  There were thirteen men's and nine women's teams.

Canada came fifth in the final rankings.

1998 Madrid 

The team competed in the 1998 World Championships, in Madrid, Spain.  There were sixteen men's and eleven women's teams.

Canada came sixth in the final rankings.

2002 Rio de Janeiro  

The team competed in the 2002 World Championships, in Rio de Janeiro, Brazil, from 30 August 2002 to 8 September 2002.  There were fourteen men's and ten women's teams.

Canada came eighth in the final rankings.

2006 Spartanburg  

The team competed in the 2006 World Championships, in July 2006, in Spartanburg, South Carolina, United States of America.  There were sixteen men's and thirteen women's teams.

Canada came sixth in the final rankings.

2010 Sheffield 

The team competed in the 2010 World Championships, from 20 to 25 June 2010, in Sheffield, England. There were sixteen men's and twelve women's teams.

Canada was in Pool A, beating Belgium, Germany, and Great Britain, drawing with Iran, and losing to Algeria, China, and USA.

2014 Espoo  

The team competed in the 2014 World Championships from 30 June to 5 July 2014, in Espoo, Finland.  There were fourteen men's and ten women's teams.  Athletes: Brendan Gaulin (#3), Bruno Hache (#5), Simon Richard (#8), Douglas Ripley (#7), Simon Tremblay (#4), and Ahmad Zeividavi (#1).

They placed sixth of eight teams in Pool B.

2018 Malmö 

The team competed in the 2018 World Championships from 3 to 8 June 2018, at the Baltiska Hallen, Malmö, Sweden.  There were sixteen men's and twelve women's teams.  Athletes included: Brendan Gaulin (Burnaby, British Columbia), Aron Ghebreyohanes (Alberta), Bruno Hache (Montreal, Quebec), Blair Nesbitt (Stony Plain, Alberta), Doug Ripley (British Columbia), and Ahmad Zeividavi (Vancouver, British Columbia).  Reserves were Peter Parsons and Simon Tremblay.

They placed sixth of eight teams in Pool B, and twelfth in final standings.

2022 Matosinhos 

The team competed in the 2022 World Championships from 7 to 16 December 2022, at the Centro de Desportos e Congressos de Matosinhos, Portugal.  There were sixteen men's and sixteen women's teams.  They placed seventh in Pool C, and thirteenth in final standings.

IBSA World Games

2003 Quebec City  

The team competed in the 2003 IBSA World Games from Friday 1 to Sunday 10 August 2011, in Quebec City, Canada.  Ten teams competed.

Canada finished third.

2011 Antalya  

The team competed in the 2011 IBSA World Games from 1 to 10 April 2011, in Antalya, Turkey, organised by the Turkish Blind Sports Federation.  There were fifteen men's and fourteen women's teams.  They placed third in Group B, and were third overall in the final standings.

Regional championships 

The team competes in the IBSA America goalball region.  The winner of the championships usually qualifies for a berth at the World Championships or the Paralympic Games.

2005 São Paulo 

The team competed at the 2005 IBSA Goalball Americas Regional Championships which were part of the Fourth IBSA Pan-American Games, the competition being from Monday 5 September 2005 to Friday 9 September 2005, in São Paulo, Brazil.  There were five men's and three women's teams.  There were five men's teams: Argentina, Brazil, Canada, Mexico, and USA.

Canada beat USA to take the gold medal.

2011 Guadalajara 

The team competed at the 2011 Parapan American Games from 13 to 19 November 2011, at the San Rafael Gymnasium in Guadalajara, Mexico.  There were six men's teams: Argentina, Brazil, Canada, El Salvador, Mexico, USA.

Canada finished fourth.

2013 Colorado Springs 

The team competed at the 2013 Parapan American Games (which also hosted the 2013 IBSA World Youth Championships) from 11 to 14 July 2013, at Colorado Springs, Colorado, USA.  There were six men's teams: Argentina, Brazil, Canada, Puerto Rico, USA, Venezuela.

Canada finished third behind Brazil and USA.

2015 Toronto 

The team competed at the 2015 Parapan American Games from 8 August 2015 to 15 August 2015, at the Mississauga Sports Centre, Toronto, Ontario, Canada.  There were six men's teams: Argentina, Brazil, Canada, Puerto Rico, USA, Venezuela.  Athletes were Brendan Gaulin, Aron Ghebreyohannes, Bruno Haché, Blair Nesbitt, Simon Richard, and Ahmad Zeividavi.

Canada came third behind USA and Brazil.

2017 São Paulo 

The team competed at the 2017 IBSA Goalball Americas Championships from Wednesday 29 November 2017 to Sunday 3 December 2017, at São Paulo, Brazil.  There were eight men's teams: Argentina, Brazil, Canada, Costa Rica, Mexico, Peru, USA, and Venezuela (Costa Rica were disqualified for not having the minimum number of athletes to start a game).

Canada came third behind USA and Brazil.

2019 Lima 

The team competed at the 2019 Parapan American Games from 23 August 2019 to 1 September 2019, at the Miguel Grau Coliseum, Lima, Peru.  This championships was a qualifier for the 2020 Paralympic Games.  There were eight men's teams: Argentina, Brazil, Canada, Guatemala, Mexico, Peru, USA, Venezuela.

Canada came third behind USA and Brazil.

2022 São Paulo 

Due to the ongoing COVID-19 pandemic, the IBSA America championship moved from 6 to 13 November 2021, to 18 to 22 February 2022.  The event is being held at the Centro de Treinamento Paralímpico (Paralympic Training Center) in São Paulo.  This championships is a qualifier for the 2022 World Championships.

There are thirteen men's teams: Argentina, Brazil, Canada, Chile, Colombia, Costa Rica, Guatemala, Mexico, Nicaragua, Peru, Puerto Rico, USA, Venezuela.

The team consists of Aaron Prevost (Alberta), Ahmad Zeividavi (British Columbia), Blair Nesbitt (Alberta), Brice Parker (Ontario), Douglas Ripley (British Columbia), Peter Parsons (Nova Scotia), with Nathalie Séguin (coach), Nadine Smith (physiotherapist), Stephen Burke (team manager).

Other tournaments

Youth male national team

2009 competition 

The 2009 IBSA Pan American Games and IBSA World Youth and Student Championships were held in Colorado Springs, Colorado, United States of America.  Canada fielded a men's team of Tyler Burk (Ottawa, On), Brendan Gaulin (Vancouver, BC), Bruno Hache (Dorval, QC), and Simon Tremblay (Quebec, QC).  Staff were Danny Snow, head coach (Calgary, AB), Robert Lebel, assistant coach (Vancouver, BC), and Isabelle Trottier, physiotherapist (Quebec, QC).

Canada also fielded 2009 youth boys team: Clement Chou (Vancouver, BC), Aron Grebreyohannes (Calgary, AB), Dylan Johnson (Madoc, ON), Paul McKnight (Calgary, AB), Aaron Prevost (Brantford, ON), and John Tee (Vancouver, BC).  Staff were Darren Hamilton, co-coach (Calgary, AB), and Trent Farebrother, co-coach (Red Deer, AB).

2011 competition 

In 2011, the IBSA World Youth and Student Championships were held in Colorado Springs, Colorado, United States of America.  Canada fielded a youth boys team of:  Athletes included Arvin Carandang (Scarborough, Ontario), Clement Chou (Vancouver, BC), and Simon Richard (Moncton, NB).  Staff were Janice Dawson, high performance head coach (Calgary, AB), Natalie Scott, assistant coach (Saskatoon, SK), and Mercedes Louro, physiotherapist (Calgary, AB).

See also 

 Canada women's national goalball team
 Canada at the Paralympics
 Goalball at the Summer Paralympic Games

References

Goalball men's
National men's goalball teams
Canada at the Paralympics
Goalball in Canada
Goalball in the Americas